Tai Wai Tsuen is a walled village in the Yuen Long Kau Hui area of Yuen Long District, Hong Kong.

Administration
Tai Wai Tsuen is a recognized village under the New Territories Small House Policy. For electoral purposes, Tai Wai Tsuen is located in the Shap Pat Heung North constituency of the Yuen Long District Council. It is currently represented by Shum Ho-kit, who was elected in the 2019 elections.

History
Tai Wai Tsuen was founded by the Wong clan and the Choi clan around the early 16th century.

Tai Wai Tsuen is part of the Tung Tau alliance or "Joint Meeting Group of Seven Villages", together with Nam Pin Wai, Tung Tau Tsuen, Choi Uk Tsuen, Ying Lung Wai, Shan Pui Tsuen and Wong Uk Tsuen. The Yi Shing Temple in Wong Uk Tsuen is an alliance temple of the Tung Tau Alliance.

See also
 Walled villages of Hong Kong

References

External links

 Delineation of area of existing village Tai Wai (Shap Pat Heung) for election of resident representative (2019 to 2022)
 Antiquities Advisory Board. Pictures of the entrance gate of Tai Wai Tsuen

Walled villages of Hong Kong
Yuen Long
Shap Pat Heung
Villages in Yuen Long District, Hong Kong